Gretta Chambers  (née Taylor; January 15, 1927 – September 9, 2017) was a Canadian journalist and former Chancellor of McGill University.

Life and career 

Chambers grew up in Outremont and attended Miss Edgar's and Miss Cramp's School and Netherwood School. She received a BA in political science from McGill University in 1947. She worked in radio and television and wrote for several newspapers and magazines. From 1966 until 1980, she was the host of the weekly CBC radio show called The Province in Print. From 1977 to 2002, she had a weekly column in the Montreal Gazette.

Since its inception in 1991, until her death in 2017, she was involved with the Montreal Consortium for Human Rights Advocacy Training (MCHRAT) at McGill University. When a MCHRAT project, the McGill Middle East Program (MMEP), took off in 1997, Chambers became a Co-Chair of its Executive and Management Committees. 
She was Chancellor of McGill University from 1991 to 1999, the first woman to serve in this position. In 2003, Martin Cauchon, Minister of Justice and Attorney General of Canada, appointed her to the Judicial Compensation and Benefits Commission, effective until August 31, 2007.

Her brother is McGill University philosopher Charles Taylor. Her husband was Egan Chambers, former Canadian member of parliament.

Honours and awards 
In 1993, she was named an Officer of the National Order of Quebec. In 1994, she was made a Member of the Order of Canada, and she was promoted to Companion in 2000.

References

External links 
 
 
 Chancellor Emerita Gretta Chambers, 1927-2017  McGill Reporter, 9 September 2017

1927 births
2017 deaths
Anglophone Quebec people
Canadian women journalists
Chancellors of McGill University
Companions of the Order of Canada
Journalists from Montreal
McGill University alumni
Officers of the National Order of Quebec
Writers from Montreal
Canadian women non-fiction writers
Canadian columnists
Canadian women columnists